Muxía is a coastal town and municipality in the province of A Coruña in the autonomous community of Galicia in northwestern Spain. It belongs to the comarca of Fisterra. It is one of the final destinations for pilgrims on the Way of St. James after visiting the shrine of the apostle Saint James the Great in Santiago de Compostela.

Muxía is known for its beaches. It has an active fishing industry.

Muxía is part of the 'Costa da Morte' or 'Costa de la Muerte' (i.e., the "Coast of Death"). The Costa Da Morte was given this name because of the large number of shipwrecks along its rocky shore. The Costa Da Morte is one of the three regions of the Costa del Marisco, or "The Seafood Coast."

Muxía is 3 kilometers from a famous Benedictine monastery that is now used as a church, the Church of San Xulián de Moraime. The name of the town, "Muxía", refers to the monks who established this monastery. Another famous church in the area is the Santuario da Virxe da Barca which stands on a rocky ridge above the surf.

There are several locations along the Costa da Morte that have a "pedra de abalar", (i.e., an "oscillating stone"), or rocking stone. One of these is in Muxía, the "Pedra da Barca". These are large stones that are balanced on a point, so that they can be moved back and forth easily, or even wiggle in response to the wind. These were used at one time to determine the guilt or innocence of those accused of serious crimes.

There was a serious oil spill involving the oil tanker "Prestige" along the Muxía part of the coast in November, 2002, leaking about 70,000 gallons of oil into the Atlantic.

History
In the 5th century and 6th century, Galicia was part of the Germanic Suevi kingdom. The Moors replaced the Germanic rulers, who were displaced in the 8th or 9th century by the king of Asturias.

The monastery near Muxía was named "Mosteiro de Moraime" to honor the saint, San Xiao de Moraime, and was established in the early 12th century. Not long after, in 1105, it was attacked and destroyed by Norman pirates, and later by Saxons. Alfonso Raimúndez, the future King and Emperor Alfonso VII of León and Castile, had lived in the area when he was younger and was educated by Pedro Froilaz de Traba. Although he was only 14 at the time, Alfonso restored the monastery with a donation in 1119.

The nearby church dedicated to "Nosa Senora da Barca", the "Santuario da Virxe da Barca" was originally a pre-Christian Celtic shrine and sacred spot. This part of Spain was resistant to conversion to Christianity, and was only converted in the 12th century. The Christians built a hermitage on this location at first, and later the present church in the 17th century. On December 25, 2013, the Santuario da Virxe da Barca was destroyed by a fire caused by lightning.

Legend has it that St. James the Greater was trying to Christianize the local inhabitants and was having no luck and was discouraged. The Virgin Mary appeared to St. James to comfort him. The Celtic stones near the church are now said to be remains of the Virgin Mary's stone boat.

Muxía was purchased by King Carlos of Castile (the Holy Roman Emperor Charles V) in the 16th century so he could have a more convenient port, and thus improve his kingdom's commerce and connections with England, where his cousin was Mary I.

Muxía was destroyed in the 19th century by Napoleon´s forces.

Demography 
From:INE Archiv

Gallery

"A Ferida" by Alberto Bañuelos is a sculpture that symbolizes the wound that has been done to the sea by the spilling of 66,000 tons of oil when the Prestige tanker broke apart off the coast of Muxia on November 13, 2002. The sculpture is 11 meters high, and weights over 400 tons.

References

External links
 pictures from the Prestige oil spill 
 A tourist article
 Another tourist article
 Saint James's Catapult: The Life and Times of Diego Gelmírez of Santiago de Compostela, Chapter 9, The Bishop in his Diocese, R. A. Fletcher, Oxford University Press 1984
 encyclopedia entry for Galicia, Columbia University Press 
   Historia de Galicia de don Benito Vicetto, tomo I, Ferrol 1865.
 Muxía, the wound, trailer for documentary about impact of the Prestige oil spill on Muxía

Tourism in Galicia (Spain)
Municipalities in the Province of A Coruña